Cabot High School (CHS) is a public high school located in Cabot, Arkansas. The school serves students in grades ten through twelve and is administered by Cabot Public Schools, which serves the city and most of northern Lonoke County.

The district, and therefore the high school's boundary, includes the communities of Cabot, Austin, and Ward.

Academics
The assumed course of study for students follows the Smart Core curriculum developed by the Arkansas Department of Education. Students complete regular (core and career focus) courses and exams and may select Advanced Placement (AP) coursework and exams that provide an opportunity for college credit.

Extracurricular activities 
The Cabot High School mascot and athletic emblem is the panther with red, white and black serving as the school colors. The school's fight song, "On, Panthers!" is based on "On, Wisconsin!."

Cabot High School's broadcasting department, in cooperation with Suddenlink Communications cable television, broadcasts Cabot High Television (CHTV) and the Cabot Schools Network (CSN) locally on channel three in the area.

Athletics 
For 2012–14, the Cabot Panthers compete in the state's largest classification—7A Classification—from the 7A/6A East Conference, as administered by the Arkansas Activities Association. The Panthers participate in football, volleyball, golf (boys/girls), bowling (boys/girls), cross country (boys/girls), basketball (boys/girls), competitive cheer, competitive dance, soccer (boys/girls), baseball, softball, wrestling, swimming & diving (boys/girls), tennis (boys/girls), track & field (boys/girls).

 Football: The Panthers won the state football championship in 1983 and 2000.C
 Volleyball: The Lady Panthers volleyball teams won consecutive state volleyball championships in 1989 and 1990.
 Golf: The boys golf team are 8-time state golf champions (1997, 1998, 1999, 2000, 2001, 2003, 2009, 2010). The girls golf team are 9-time state golf champions including winning its first title in 1976 before piling up 8 consecutive state golf titles between 1986 and 1993.
 Bowling: The girls bowling team are 4-time state bowling champions (2009, 2011, 2013, 2015).The boys bowling team are 4-time state bowling champions (2012, 2013, 2014, 2015). Both have 8 state championships and 11 conference titles 
 Basketball: The Lady Panthers won their first state basketball championship in 2012. The Panthers won their first title in 2016, defeating Bentonville and Malik Monk, 59-49.

Speech and debate 
Cabot High School currently has two major programs within the National Speech and Debate Association, serving as Cabot Debate and Cabot Forensics. The current head of the program is Tiffany Tucker, who replaced the late Jennifer Akers. The debate program is headed by Rachel Mauchline, who has received national recognition by ACTAA. Cabot High School has ranked 1st in Arkansas as of 2021, and top 50 within the NSDA program. Their charter is the Arkansas Communication and Theatre Arts Association abbreviated as ACTAA.

Notable people
 Kimberly Forsyth (1997), Miss Arkansas USA 2006
Ricky Hill, member of the Arkansas Senate
 Bryce Mitchell (2013), UFC fighter
 Terri Utley (1980), Miss USA 1982, Miss Arkansas USA 1982
 Cody Wilson (2006), weapons developer and founder of Defense Distributed
 Lexi Weeks (2015), pole vaulter who qualified for the 2016 Summer Olympics

See also

Cabot Public Schools
Cabot, Arkansas

References

External links
Official website

1912 establishments in Arkansas
Public high schools in Arkansas
Educational institutions established in 1912
Schools in Lonoke County, Arkansas
Cabot, Arkansas